Mont Saint-Grégoire is a mountain in the Montérégie region of southern Quebec, Canada. It is composed of essexite and syenite, strongly contrasting with the surrounding sedimentary rocks. The area around Mont Saint-Grégoire is known for its maple syrup production, as well as some wine production.

The name was changed in 1923 from Mount Johnson .

Geology

It is thought that Mont Saint-Grégoire might be the deep extension of a vastly eroded ancient volcanic complex, which was probably active about 125 million years ago. The mountain was created when the North American Plate moved westward over the New England hotspot, along with the other mountains of the Monteregian Hills. It forms part of the vast Great Meteor hotspot track.

References

Mont Saint Gregoire
Mountains of Quebec under 1000 metres
Igneous petrology of Quebec
Stocks (geology)